The Seret (Ukrainian: Серéт) is the left tributary of the Dniester that flows through the Ternopil Oblast of Ukraine. The towns of Ternopil, Terebovlia and Chortkiv sit along the river's banks. Some of the bloodiest fighting of World War I took place on the banks of the Seret.

Location
It consists of the merger of several small rivers near the village of Ratyshchi district. Seretha hills are located between the hills of Voronyaky, the middle current - within the Ternopil plateau, the lower reaches - in the Dniester canyon area. The main direction of the current from north to south (partly to the southeast).

Usage
Water is used for technical water supply, agricultural needs, fish breeding; there are recreational zones.

Tributaries
Right: Hrabarka, Seret-Pravyi, Smolyanka, Nesterivka, Dovzhanka, Bridok, Nishla, Hnyla Rudka, Pereima, Cherkaska, 

References 

Rivers of Ternopil Oblast